Wilbur B. Foshay (1881–1957) was an American businessman, who built a fortune buying utilities throughout the Midwest in the early 20th century.  Foshay had built up three different utility company empires; selling each one in turn to fund the acquisition phase of the next. His second empire included three utility companies that served the Crookston, Bemidji, and Hallock areas in northern Minnesota (all are today served by Otter Tail Power Company). As he worked on his third and largest utility empire, Foshay built the Foshay Tower in Minneapolis, Minnesota, which opened in August 1929.  In 1932 he was convicted of conducting a "pyramid scheme" with shares of his own stock. He was sentenced to 15 years in prison.  President Franklin Roosevelt commuted 10 years from Foshay's sentence, but Foshay only actually served three years in Leavenworth because of "good behavior."  President Harry Truman granted Foshay a full and unconditional pardon in 1947. The remnants of this third company became the basis for Citizens Utilities.

Foshay's trial
Foshay's trial was a public spectacle at the time.  Journalists, investors, and the general public all wanted to know how Foshay had misled them.  At one point during the trial, Foshay claimed he was colorblind to explain peculiar marks in his accounting books—"in the red" and "in the black" were marked by symbols rather than ink color, when really these marks represented which entries were artificially inflated.  The trial lasted six weeks.  The jury deliberated, but could not reach a consensus.  All the male jurors voted for conviction, but Mrs. Genevieve Clark stubbornly held out.  A mistrial was declared.

It was later discovered that Genevieve Clark had worked for the Foshay Company at one time, and that her husband knew Foshay personally through doing business with him.  Clark was charged with contempt of court.  A Supreme Court appeal failed.  She was sentenced to six months in prison.  Clark was publicly humiliated for her actions as a juror in the case. To avoid surrendering to authorities, she and her family disappeared.  Clark, her husband and two young boys were found dead from intentional carbon monoxide poisoning.

A second trial was held, and Foshay was convicted and sentenced to 15 years in prison.

References

External links 
 Wilbur Foshay in MNopedia, the Minnesota Encyclopedia

Businesspeople from Minneapolis
1881 births
1957 deaths
American fraudsters
American white-collar criminals
American businesspeople convicted of crimes
20th-century American businesspeople